The 2018 All-Big Ten Conference football team consists of American football players chosen as All-Big Ten Conference players for the 2018 Big Ten Conference football season.  The conference recognizes two official All-Big Ten selectors: (1) the Big Ten conference coaches selected separate offensive and defensive units and named first-, second- and third-team players (the "Coaches" team); and (2) a panel of sports writers and broadcasters covering the Big Ten also selected offensive and defensive units and named first-, second- and third-team players (the "Media" team).

Offensive selections

Quarterbacks
 Dwayne Haskins, Ohio State (Coaches-1; Media-1)
 Trace McSorley, Penn State (Coaches-2; Media-2)
 Shea Patterson, Michigan (Coaches-3)
 David Blough, Purdue (Media-3)

Running backs
 Karan Higdon, Michigan (Coaches-1; Media-1)
 Jonathan Taylor, Wisconsin (Coaches-1; Media-1)
 Miles Sanders, Penn State (Coaches-2; Media-2)
 Anthony McFarland Jr., Maryland (Coaches-3; Media-2)
 J. K. Dobbins, Ohio State (Coaches-2)
 Reggie Corbin, Illinois (Coaches-3; Media-3)

Wide receivers
 Rondale Moore, Purdue (Coaches-1; Media-1)
 Parris Campbell, Ohio State (Coaches-1; Media-2)
 Tyler Johnson, Minnesota (Coaches-2; Media-1)
 Stanley Morgan Jr., Nebraska (Coaches-2; Media-2)
 J. D. Spielman, Nebraska (Coaches-3; Media-3)
 K. J. Hill, Ohio State (Media-3)
 Donovan Peoples-Jones, Michigan (Coaches-3)

Centers
 Tyler Biadasz, Wisconsin (Coaches-1; Media-1)
 Michael Jordan, Ohio State (Coaches-2; Media-2)
 Cesar Ruiz, Michigan (Coaches-3)
 Keegan Render, Iowa (Media-3)

Guards
 Beau Benzschawel, Wisconsin (Coaches-1; Media-1)
 Michael Deiter, Wisconsin (Coaches-1; Media-1)
 Ben Bredeson, Michigan (Coaches-2; Media-2)
 Ross Reynolds, Iowa (Coaches-2; Media-3)
 Connor McGovern, Penn State (Coaches-3; Media-3)
 Nick Allegretti, Illinois (Media-2)
 Demetrius Knox, Ohio State (Media-3)
 Michael Onwenu, Michigan (Coaches-3)

Tackles
 Isaiah Prince, Ohio State (Coaches-1; Media-1)
 David Edwards, Wisconsin (Coaches-2; Media-1)
 Jon Runyan Jr., Michigan (Coaches-1; Media-2)
 Alaric Jackson, Iowa (Coaches-2; Media-2)
 Ryan Bates, Penn State (Coaches-3; Media-3)
 Damian Prince, Maryland (Media-3)
 Rashawn Slater, Northwestern (Coaches-3)

Tight ends
 Noah Fant, Iowa (Coaches-1; Media-2)
 T. J. Hockenson, Iowa (Coaches-2; Media-1)
 Zach Gentry, Michigan (Coaches-3)
 Brycen Hopkins, Purdue (Media-3)

Defensive selections

Defensive linemen
 Chase Winovich, Michigan (Coaches-1; Media-1)
 Kenny Willekes, Michigan State (Coaches-1; Media-1)
 Rashan Gary, Michigan (Coaches-1; Media-2)
 Dre'Mont Jones, Ohio State (Coaches-1; Media-2)
 A. J. Epenesa, Iowa (Coaches-2; Media-1)
 Yetur Gross-Matos, Penn State (Coaches-3; Media-1)
 Carter Coughlin, Minnesota (Coaches-2; Media-2)
 Joe Gaziano, Northwestern (Coaches-2; Media-3)
 Anthony Nelson, Iowa (Coaches-3; Media-2)
 Chase Young, Ohio State (Coaches-2; Media-3)
 Shareef Miller, Penn State (Coaches-3; Media-3)
 Raequan Williams, Michigan State (Coaches-3; Media-3)

Linebackers
 Devin Bush, Michigan (Coaches-1; Media-1)
 Joe Bachie, Michigan State (Coaches-1; Media-2)
 T. J. Edwards, Wisconsin (Coaches-2; Media-1)
 Paddy Fisher, Northwestern (Coaches-1; Media-2)
 Tre Watson, Maryland (Coaches-2; Media-1)
 Markus Bailey, Purdue (Coaches-2; Media-3)
 Blake Cashman, Minnesota (Coaches-3; Media-2)
 Mohamed Barry, Nebraska (Media-3)
 Ryan Connelly, Wisconsin (Coaches-3)
 Blake Gallagher, Northwestern (Media-3)
 Andrew Van Ginkel, Wisconsin (Coaches-3)

Defensive backs
 Amani Hooker, Iowa (Coaches-1; Media-1)
 Lavert Hill, Michigan (Coaches-1; Media-1)
 Amani Oruwariye, Penn State (Coaches-1; Media-1)
 Montre Hartage, Northwestern (Coaches-3; Media-1)
 David Long, Michigan (Coaches-1; Media-3)
 Justin Layne, Michigan State (Coaches-2; Media-2)
 Josh Metellus, Michigan (Coaches-2; Media-2)
 Darnell Savage, Maryland (Coaches-2; Media-2)
 Antoine Brooks, Maryland (Coaches-2)
 Jordan Fuller, Ohio State (Media-2)
 Dicaprio Bootle, Nebraska (Coaches-3; Media-3)
 D'Cota Dixon, Wisconsin (Coaches-3; Media-3)
 David Dowell, Michigan State (Coaches-3)
 Khari Willis, Michigan State (Media-3)

Special teams

Kickers
 Matt Coghlin, Michigan State (Coaches-3; Media-1)
 Chase McLaughlin, Illinois (Coaches-1; Media-2)
 Logan Justus, Indiana (Coaches-2; Media-3)

Punters
 Will Hart, Michigan (Coaches-1; Media-1)
 Drue Chrisman, Ohio State (Coaches-2; Media-2)
 Blake Hayes, Illinois (Media-3)
 Joe Schopper, Purdue (Coaches-3)

Return specialist
 Rondale Moore, Purdue (Coaches-1; Media-2)
 Ihmir Smith-Marsette, Iowa (Coaches-2; Media-1)
 Donovan Peoples-Jones, Michigan (Coaches-3; Media-3)

Key

See also
 2018 College Football All-America Team

References

All-Big Ten Conference
All-Big Ten Conference football teams